Castillo de Teayo Municipality is one of the 212 municipalities of the Mexican state of Veracruz. It is located in the state's Huasteca Baja region. The municipal seat is the village of Castillo de Teayo.

In the 2005 INEGI Census, the municipality reported a total population of 18,424  (down from 19,335 in 1995), of whom 4,159 lived in the municipal seat. 
Of the municipality's inhabitants, 1,970 (10.52%) spoke an indigenous language, primarily Nahuatl.

The municipality of Castillo de Teayo covers a total surface area of 447.46 km².

Name
"Teayo" comes from the Nahuatl te-ayo-k, which means "tortoise atop stone". This is a reference to the archaeological site known as the  Castle of Teayo, a syncretic blend of the Toltec, Mexica, and Huastec  cultures

Settlements
Castillo de Teayo (municipal seat; 2005 population 4159)
Mequetla (1614)
La Guadalupe (1504)
Teayo (1402)
La Defensa (1117)

References

External links 
  Municipal Official Site
  Municipal Official Information

Municipalities of Veracruz